Quercus serrata, the jolcham oak, is an East Asian species of tree in the beech family.  It is native to China, Taiwan, Japan, and Korea.

Description
The bark is gray or reddish-brown with longitudinal furrows. The petioles are short (3 cm).

The plant frequently attracts stinkbugs which lay their eggs inside them.

References

External links
line drawing, Flora of China Illustrations vol. 4, fig. 364, 1-11 

serrata
Plants described in 1784
Flora of Eastern Asia
Trees of China
Trees of Korea